Mollington is a civil parish in Cheshire West and Chester, England. It contains ten buildings that are recorded in the National Heritage List for England as designated listed buildings, all of which are at Grade II. This grade is the lowest of the three gradings given to listed buildings and is applied to "buildings of national importance and special interest". Apart from the village of Mollington, the parish is rural. The listed buildings include houses, farmhouses, a farm building, a sundial, an icehouse, a guidepost, a canal bridge, and a railway viaduct.

See also
 Listed buildings in Capenhurst
 Listed buildings in Chester

 Listed buildings in Puddington
 Listed buildings in Saughall
 Listed buildings in Shotwick Park
 Listed buildings in Upton-by-Chester

References
Citations

Sources

Listed buildings in Cheshire West and Chester
Lists of listed buildings in Cheshire